Leonardo Martín Mayer (Mayer locally  or , ; born May 15, 1987) is a former professional tennis player from Argentina. Mayer achieved a career-high singles ranking of world No. 21 in June 2015 and world No. 48 in doubles in January 2019. He was coached by Alejandro Fabbri and Leo Alonso. He was born in Corrientes and resides in Buenos Aires.

Career

Early career 
Mayer started playing tennis at age nine.

2005-2008: Juniors and ITF 
As a junior, Mayer won the 2005 French Open Boys' Doubles and the Orange Bowl with Emiliano Massa, reaching as high as No. 2 in the combined world rankings in June 2005.

He won one Challenger singles title in 2008 and lost in three other finals.

2009–2013: Becoming a professional tennis player 
Mayer qualified for his first Grand Slam at the 2009 French Open and beat 15th seed James Blake in straight sets in the first round. He lost to Tommy Haas in five sets in the second round. At Wimbledon, he beat Óscar Hernández in straight sets in the first round. He lost to Fernando González in four sets in the second round.

Mayer had a successful American summer, reaching the semifinals of the LA Tennis Open (lost to Carsten Ball) and the quarterfinals of the Pilot Pen Tennis tournament in New Haven (lost to Igor Andreev). At the 2009 US Open, Mayer reached the second round, losing to Radek Štěpánek in straight sets.

In 2011, Mayer qualified for the Brasil Open and defeated world no. 73 Igor Andreev in the first round of the main draw. In the second round, he played seventh-seeded Italian Potito Starace and lost.

Mayer reached the third round of the French Open for the third time and the US Open in 2012, losing to Nicolás Almagro in straight sets at Roland Garros and Juan Martín del Potro in New York.

2014: First ATP title and top 30

In February 2014, Mayer reached his first career ATP final at Viña del Mar, defeating second seed Tommy Robredo en route. Mayer lost to top-seed Fabio Fognini in straight sets. At Oeiras and Niza, he reached the quarterfinals as a qualifier in both. He was defeated in the third round of the French Open by Rafael Nadal.

At Wimbledon, he reached the fourth round of a Grand Slam for the first time. He defeated No. 25 seed Andreas Seppi, former Wimbledon semifinalist and Australian Open runner-up Marcos Baghdatis, and Andrey Kuznetsov before being defeated by Grigor Dimitrov in straight sets. With this run, Mayer was ranked in the top 50 for the first time in his career.

Next, Mayer played in the 2014 MercedesCup, where he lost in the second round to Mikhail Youzhny. Then, he played at the 2014 International German Open, where he beat Guillermo García-López and Philipp Kohlschreiber, reaching the final without dropping a set. In the final, he defeated top seed David Ferrer in three sets, winning his first ATP title.

Seeded 23rd at the 2014 US Open, Mayer reached the third round, being defeated by Kei Nishikori. In the doubles tournament, he partnered with compatriot Carlos Berlocq and made it to the quarterfinals, beating the reigning Wimbledon champions Jack Sock and Vasek Pospisil.

Mayer won his two singles rubbers against Israel in the Davis Cup Play-offs, helping Argentina to secure a place in the 2015 World Group.

Mayer lost in the second round at the Malaysian Open to Jarkko Nieminen and in the first round of the China Open to Martin Klizan. He lost in the second round of the Shanghai Masters to Roger Federer, who saved five match points against Mayer.

2015: Career high ranking of World No. 21
Mayer started the year at Doha, where he lost in the first round in a tight three-set match against Andreas Seppi. Then, he competed in the Apia International Sydney, where he reached the semifinals but was defeated by Mikhail Kukushkin. In the Australian Open, he was seeded 27th but was defeated by Viktor Troicki in four sets in the second round.

Next, Mayer reached the quarterfinals at the Brasil Open, being defeated by local favourite João Souza. On March 8, 2015, he played in the longest singles match in Davis Cup history, beating João Souza in 6 hours and 42 minutes, 7–6(7–4), 7–6(7–5), 5–7, 5–7, 15–13. Mayer was unable to recover in time for the Indian Wells Masters and was defeated in the third round of the Miami Masters by Kevin Anderson.

The Argentine started the European clay-court swing with a first round loss in Barcelona. Then, he reached the third round at Madrid and the second round in the Rome Masters. In the Open de Nice Côte d'Azur, he reached the third ATP final of his career, losing to Dominic Thiem. Mayer reached the third round of the French Open as the 23rd seed, being defeated by Marin Čilić in straight sets.

In the grass court season, Mayer reached the quarterfinals at Nottingham (lost to Denis Istomin) and the third round of Wimbledon where he was the 24th seed before he (lost to Kevin Anderson) in straight sets.

2016: Davis Cup Champion

Mayer lost in the first round of the 2016 Australian Open and the 2016 French Open. He had minor success in the 2016 Indian Wells Masters beating Sam Groth and 20th seed Viktor Troicki before losing to Marin Čilić in the third round. In the 2016 Wimbledon Championships, he lost in the first round to Donald Young.

In the Davis Cup semifinal between Great Britain and Argentina, Mayer beat Daniel Evans in the fifth and deciding rubber, sending Argentina into its fifth Davis Cup Final. Mayer teamed with Juan Martín del Potro for doubles in the Davis Cup Final against Croatia. They lost to Marin Čilić and Ivan Dodig. However, Argentina won their first championship 3 to 2.

2017: Second ATP title and back to top 50

Mayer lost in the second round of the 2017 Argentina Open and the 2017 U.S. Men's Clay Court Championships (lost to John Isner). In July he lost in the 2nd round of qualifying to a teenager in the 2017 German Open only to enter the MD as lucky loser and win his first tournament as a father (his son Valentino was born in February 2017).

He became the first lucky loser to win an ATP 500 tournament. In the final, he defeated Florian Mayer in three sets, winning his second ATP 500 title. Due to winning his second Hamburg title, Mayer climbed 89 spots, breaking into the top 50 for the first time since 2016, at number 49.

2018: 3rd Hamburg Final 

Defeated 3 players ranked outside Top 100 to reach ATP Masters 1000 Indian Wells 4R (lost to his boyhood friend and eventual champion Juan Martin del Potro in 3 sets). Reached QFs at Buenos Aires and Sao Paulo. Improved to 2–29 vs. Top 10 players by beating Kevin Anderson in 3rd-set TB at London/Queen’s Club. Fell to A. Zverev in ATP Masters 1000 Madrid 3R, but earned only break point faced by German en route to title. Squandered 6 MPs vs. Nicolas Jarry in the ATP Estoril 1R (most of all players to lose a match this season). Blew a 2-set lead for 1st time in career at Wimbledon (lost to Struff in 1R). Finished as Brisbane doubles runner-up in 1st event with Zeballos since 2010 Wimbledon (l. to Kontinen/Peers).

2019: Australian Open doubles semifinal and French Open singles fourth round
Mayer reached the semifinals of a Grand Slam in doubles for the first time in his career at the 2019 Australian Open partnering João Sousa. The pair also reached the quarterfinals at the 2019 US Open.

He made the fourth round of the French Open where he lost to world No. 3 Roger Federer in straight sets.

2020: Severe dip in form

Mayer only played eight matches in 2020 and lost all eight. His final Grand Slam was the 2020 US Open where he lost in the first round to 25th seed Milos Raonic in straight sets.

2021: Retirement

Mayer played his last ATP tournament at the 2021 Chile Open where he lost in the first round to Pedro Sousa in straight sets. His last event was 2021 Wimbledon qualifying where he lost in the first round to compatriot Marco Trungelliti in straight sets.

On October 7, 2021, Mayer announced his retirement from tennis.

ATP career finals

Singles: 5 (2 titles, 3 runner-ups)

Doubles: 5 (1 title, 4 runner-ups)

Records
 These records were attained in the Open Era of tennis.

Team competitions finals

Davis Cup: 1 (1 title)

ATP Challenger and ITF Futures finals

Singles: 22 (10-12)

Doubles: 19 (11–8)

Junior Grand Slam finals

Doubles: 1 (1 title)

Performance timelines

Singles
''Current through the 2021 Wimbledon Championships.

Doubles

Top-10 wins per season
He has a  record against players who were, at the time the match was played, ranked in the top 10.

Personal life 
Mayer is married to fellow Argentinian Milagros Aventin.

Notes

References

External links 

Official website 

1987 births
Living people
Argentine male tennis players
Argentine people of German descent
People from Corrientes
Tennis players from Buenos Aires
French Open junior champions
Grand Slam (tennis) champions in boys' doubles